A clipper was a type of mid-19th-century merchant sailing vessel, designed for speed. Clippers were generally narrow for their length, small by later 19th century standards, could carry limited bulk freight, and had a large total sail area. "Clipper" does not refer to a specific sailplan; clippers may be schooners, brigs, brigantines, etc., as well as full-rigged ships. Clippers were mostly constructed in British and American shipyards, although France, Brazil, the Netherlands and other nations also produced some. Clippers sailed all over the world, primarily on the trade routes between the United Kingdom and China, in transatlantic trade, and on the New York-to-San Francisco route around Cape Horn during the California Gold Rush. Dutch clippers were built beginning in the 1850s for the tea trade and passenger service to Java.

The boom years of the clipper era began in 1843 in response to a growing demand for faster delivery of tea from China. This continued under the stimulating influence of the discovery of gold in California and Australia in 1848 and 1851 and ended with the opening of the Suez Canal in 1869.

Origin and usage of "clipper"
The term "clipper" most likely derives from the verb "clip", which in former times meant, among other things, to run or fly swiftly. Dryden, the English poet, used the word "clip" to describe the swift flight of a falcon in the 17th century when he said "And, with her eagerness the quarry missed, Straight flies at check, and clips it down the wind." The ships appeared to clip along the ocean water. The term "clip" became synonymous with "speed" and was also applied to fast horses and sailing ships. "To clip it", and "going at a good clip", are remaining  expressions.

The first application of the term "clipper", in a nautical sense, is uncertain. The Baltimore Clipper was in use over the last quarter of the 18th century through to the first half of the 19th century, but under a different name for much of that time. At first, these vessels were referred to as "Virginia-built" or "pilot-boat model"—with the name "Baltimore-built" appearing during the War of 1812. It was not until the final days of the slave trade (c. 1835 -1850)—just as the type was dying out—that the name "Baltimore Clipper" became common. The retrospective application of the word "clipper" to this type has been a source of confusion.

The Oxford English Dictionary's earliest quote (referring to the Baltimore Clipper) is from 1824. The Dictionary cites Royal Navy officer and novelist Frederick Marryat as using the term in 1830. British newspaper usage of the term can be found as early as 1832 and in shipping adverts from 1835. A US court case of 1834 has evidence which discusses a clipper being faster than a brig.

Definitions
A clipper is a sailing vessel designed for speed, a priority which takes precedence over cargo carrying capacity, or building or operating costs. It is not restricted to any one rig, and while many were fully rigged ships, others were barques, brigs or schooners. Nor was the term restricted to any one hull type. Howard Chapelle lists three basic hull types for clippers. The first was characterised by the sharp  and ends found in the Baltimore Clipper. The second was a hull with a full mid-section and modest deadrise, but sharp endsthis was a development of the hull-form of transatlantic packets. The third was more experimental, with deadrise and sharpness being balanced against the need to carry a profitable quantity of cargo. As well as a fast hull, a clipper carried a large sail areaby the standards of any other type of sailing ship, a clipper was greatly over-canvassed. The last defining feature of a clipper, in the view of maritime historian David MacGregor, was a captain who had the courage, skill and determination to get the fastest speed possible out of her.

In assessing the hull of a clipper, different maritime historians use different criteria to measure "sharpness". "Sharpness" or "fineness" is explained by comparing a rectangular cuboid with the underwater shape of a vessel's hull. The more material you have to carve off the cuboid to achieve the hull shape, the sharper the hull. Ideally a maritime historian would be able to look at either the block coefficient of fineness or the prismatic coefficient of various clippers, but measured drawings or accurate half-models may not exist to calculate either of these figures. An alternative measure of sharpness for hulls of a broadly similar shape is the coefficient of under-deck-tonnage, as used by David MacGregor in comparing tea clippers. This could be calculated from the measurements taken to determine the registered tonnage, and so can be applied to more vessels.

An extreme clipper has a hull of great fineness, as judged either by the prismatic coefficient, the coefficient of under-deck-tonnage or some other technical assessment of hull shape. It is a term that has been misapplied in the past, without reference to hull shape. As commercial vessels, these are totally reliant on speed to generate a profit for their owners, as their sharpness limits their cargo carrying capacity.

A medium clipper has a cargo-carrying hull that has some sharpness. In the right conditions and with a capable captain, some of these achieved notable quick passages. They were also able to pay their way when the high freight rates often paid to a fast sailer were not available (in a fluctuating market).

The term "clipper" applied to vessels between these two categories. They often made passages as fast as extreme clippers, but had less difficulty in making a living when freight rates were lower.

History

The first ships to which the term "clipper" seems to have been applied were the Baltimore clippers, developed in the Chesapeake Bay before the American Revolution, and reaching their zenith between 1795 and 1815.  They were small, rarely exceeding 200 tons OM. Their hulls were sharp ended and displayed a lot of deadrise. They were rigged as schooners, brigs or brigantines.
In the War of 1812 some were lightly armed, sailing under Letters of Marque and Reprisal, when the type—exemplified by Chasseur, launched at Fells Point, Baltimore in 1814—became known for her incredible speed; the deep draft enabled the Baltimore clipper to sail close to the wind. Clippers, running the British blockade of Baltimore, came to be recognized for speed rather than cargo space.

The type existed as early as 1780. A 1789 drawing of —purchased by the Royal Navy in 1780 in the West Indies—represents the earliest draught of what became known as the Baltimore Clipper

Speed was also required for the opium trade from India to China. The fast-sailing vessels used were called Opium Clippers. Some of these were built specifically for the purposemostly in India and Britain. Some fruit schooners were bought for this trade, as were some Baltimore clippers.

Vessels of the Baltimore clipper type continued to be built for the slave trade, being useful for escaping enforcement of the British and American legislation prohibiting the trans-atlantic slave trade. Some of these Baltimore clippers were captured when working as slavers, condemned by the appropriate court, and sold to owners who then used them as opium clippersmoving from one illegal international trade to another.

Ann McKim, built in Baltimore in 1833 by the Kennard & Williamson shipyard, is considered by  some to be the original clipper ship. (Maritime historians Howard I. Chapelle and David MacGregor decry the concept of the "first" clipper, preferring a more evolutionary, multi-stepped development of the type.) She measured 494 tons OM, and was built on the enlarged lines of a Baltimore clipper, with sharply raked stem, counter stern and square rig. Although Ann McKim was the first large clipper ship ever constructed, it cannot be said that she founded the clipper ship era, or even that she directly influenced shipbuilders, since no other ship was built like her; but she may have suggested the clipper design in vessels of ship rig. She did, however, influence the building of Rainbow in 1845, the first extreme clipper ship.

In Aberdeen, Scotland, the shipbuilders Alexander Hall and Sons developed the "Aberdeen" clipper bow in the late 1830s: the first was Scottish Maid launched in 1839. Scottish Maid, 150 tons OM, was the first British clipper ship. "Scottish Maid was intended for the Aberdeen-London trade, where speed was crucial to compete with steamships. The Hall brothers tested various hulls in a water tank and found the clipper design most effective. The design was influenced by tonnage regulations. Tonnage measured a ship's cargo capacity and was used to calculate tax and harbour dues. The new 1836 regulations measured depth and breadth with length measured at half midship depth. Extra length above this level was tax-free and became a feature of clippers. Scottish Maid proved swift and reliable and the design was widely copied." The earliest British clipper ships were built for trade within the British Isles (Scottish Maid was built for the Aberdeen to London trade). Then followed the vast clipper trade of tea, opium, spices and other goods from the Far East to Europe, and the ships became known as "tea clippers".

From 1839, larger American clipper ships started to be built beginning with Akbar, 650 tons OM, in 1839, and including the 1844-built Houqua, 581 tons OM. These larger vessels were built predominantly for use in the China tea trade and known as "tea clippers". Smaller clipper vessels also continued to be built predominantly for the China opium trade and known as "opium clippers" such as the 1842-built Ariel, 100 tons OM.

Then in 1845 Rainbow, 757 tons OM, the first extreme clipper was launched in New York. These American clippers were larger vessels designed to sacrifice cargo capacity for speed. They had a bow lengthened above the water, a drawing out and sharpening of the forward body, and the greatest breadth further aft. Extreme clippers were built in the period 1845 to 1855.

In 1851, shipbuilders in Medford, Massachusetts built what is sometimes called one of the first medium clippers, the Antelope, often called the Antelope of Boston to distinguish her from other ships of the same name. A contemporary ship-design journalist noted that "the design of her model was to combine large stowage capacity with good sailing qualities." The Antelope was relatively flat-floored and had only an 8-inch dead rise at half-floor.

The medium clipper, though still very fast, could carry more cargo. After 1854 extreme clippers were replaced in American shipbuilding yards by medium clippers.

The Flying Cloud was a clipper ship built in 1851 that established the fastest passage between New York and San Francisco within weeks of its launching, then broker her own records three years later, which stood at 89 days 8 hours until 1989. (The other contender for this "blue ribbon" title was the medium clipper Andrew Jackson—there is an unresolvable argument over timing these voyages "from pilot to pilot"). Flying Cloud was the most famous of the clippers built by Donald McKay. She was known for her extremely close race with the Hornet in 1853; for having a woman navigator, Eleanor Creesy, wife of Josiah Perkins Creesy, who skippered the Flying Cloud on two record-setting voyages from New York to San Francisco; and for sailing in the Australia and timber trades.

Clipper ships largely ceased being built in American shipyards in 1859 when, unlike the earlier boom years, only four clipper ships were built; a few were built in the 1860s.  The last American clipper ship was "the Pilgrim" launched in 1873 from the shipyards of Medford, Massachusetts, built by Joshua T. Foster.  Among shipowners of the day, "Medford-built" came to mean the best.

British clipper ships continued to be built after 1859. From 1859 a new design was developed for British clipper ships that was nothing like the American clippers; these ships continued to be called extreme clippers. The new design had a sleek graceful appearance, less sheer, less freeboard, lower bulwarks, and smaller breadth. They were built for the China tea trade, starting with Falcon in 1859, and continuing until 1870. The earlier ships were made from wood, though some were made from iron, just as some British clippers had been made from iron prior to 1859. In 1863 the first tea clippers of composite construction were brought out, combining the best of both worlds. Composite clippers had the strength of iron spars with wooden hulls, and copper sheathing could be added to prevent the fouling that occurred on iron hulls.

After 1869, with the opening of the Suez Canal that greatly advantaged steam vessels (see Decline below), the tea trade collapsed for clippers. From the late 1860s until the early 1870s the clipper trade increasingly focused on the Britain to Australia and New Zealand route, carrying goods and immigrants, services that had begun earlier with the Australian Gold Rush of the 1850s. British-built clipper ships and many American-built British-owned ships were used. Even in the 1880s, sailing ships were still the main carriers of cargoes between Britain, and Australia and New Zealand. This trade eventually became unprofitable, and the ageing clipper fleet became unseaworthy.

China clippers and the apogee of sail 

Among the most notable clippers were the China clippers, also called tea clippers or opium clippers, designed to ply the trade routes between Europe and the East Indies. The last example of these still in reasonable condition is Cutty Sark, preserved in dry dock at Greenwich, United Kingdom. Damaged by fire on 21 May 2007 while undergoing conservation, the ship was permanently elevated three metres above the dry dock floor in 2010 as part of a plan for long-term preservation.

Before the early 18th century, the East India Company paid for its tea mainly in silver. When the Chinese Emperor chose to embargo European manufactured commodities and demand payment for all Chinese goods in silver, the price rose, restricting trade. The East India Company began to produce something desired by the Chinese as much as tea was by the British: opium. This had a significant influence on both India and China. Opium was also imported into Britain and was not prohibited because it was thought to be medically beneficial. Laudanum, made from opium, was used as a pain killer, to induce sleep and to suppress anxiety. The famous literary opium addicts Thomas De Quincey, Samuel Taylor Coleridge and Wilkie Collins also took it for its pleasurable effects. The Limehouse area in London was notorious for its opium dens, many of which catered for Chinese sailors as well as English addicts.

Clippers were built for seasonal trades such as tea, where an early cargo was more valuable, or for passenger routes. One passenger ship survives, the City of Adelaide designed by William Pile of Sunderland. The fast ships were ideally suited to low-volume, high-profit goods, such as tea, opium, spices, people, and mail. The return could be spectacular. The Challenger returned from Shanghai with "the most valuable cargo of tea and silk ever to be laden in one bottom". Competition among the clippers was public and fierce, with their times recorded in the newspapers.

However, their average speeds over a whole voyage were substantially less. The joint winner of the Great Tea Race of 1866 logged about 15,800 nautical miles on a 99 day trip. The key to a fast passage for a tea clipper was getting across the China Sea against the monsoon winds that prevailed when the first tea crop of the season was ready. These difficult sailing conditions (light and/or contrary winds) dictated the design of tea clippers. The US clippers were designed for the strong winds encountered on their route around Cape Horn.

Donald McKay's Sovereign of the Seas  reported the highest speed ever achieved by a sailing ship – , made while running her easting down to Australia in 1854.  (John Griffiths' first clipper, the Rainbow, had a top speed of 14 knots.) There are eleven other instances of a ship's logging  or over.  Ten of these were recorded by American clippers.
And with few exceptions all the port-to-port sailing records are held by the American clippers.
The 24h record of the Champion of the Seas set in 1854, wasn't broken until 1984 (by a multihull), or 2001 (by another monohull).

Decline

The American clippers sailing from the East Coast to the California goldfields were working in a booming market. Freight rates were high everywhere in the first years of the 1850s. This started to fade in late 1853. The ports of California and Australia reported that they were overstocked with goods that had been shipped earlier in the year. This gave an accelerating fall in freight rates that was halted, however, by the start of the Crimean War in March 1854, as many ships were now being chartered by the French and British governments. The end of the Crimean War in April 1856 released all this capacity back on the world shipping markets - the result being a severe slump. The next year saw the Panic of 1857, which had effects on both sides of the Atlantic. The United States was just starting to recover from this in 1861 when the American Civil War started, causing significant disruption to trade in both Union and Confederate states.
As the economic situation deteriorated in 1853, American shipowners either did not order new vessels, or specified an ordinary clipper or a medium clipper instead of an extreme clipper. No extreme clipper was launched in an American shipyard after the end of 1854 and only a few medium clippers after 1860.

By contrast, British trade recovered well at the end of the 1850s. Tea clippers had continued to be launched during the depressed years, apparently little affected by the economic downturn. The long-distance route to China was not realistically challenged by steamships in the early part of the 1860s. No true steamer (as opposed to an auxiliary steamship) had the fuel efficiency to carry sufficient cargo to make a profitable voyage. The auxiliary steamships struggled to make any profit.

The situation changed in 1866 when the Alfred Holt-designed and owned SS Agamemnon made her first voyage to China. Holt had persuaded the Board of Trade to allow higher steam pressures in British merchant vessels. Running at 60 psi instead of the previously permitted 25 psi, and using an efficient compound engine, Agamemnon had the fuel efficiency to steam at 10 knots to China and back, with coaling stops at Mauritius on the outward and return legs - crucially carrying sufficient cargo to make a profit.

In 1869 the Suez Canal opened, giving steamships a route about  shorter than that taken by sailing ships round the Cape of Good Hope. Despite initial conservatism by tea merchants, by 1871 tea clippers found strong competition from steamers in the tea ports of China. A typical passage time back to London for a steamer was 58 days, while the very fastest clippers could occasionally make the trip in less than 100 days; the average was 123 days in the 1867–68 tea season. The freight rate for a steamer in 1871 was roughly double that paid to a sailing vessel. Some clipper owners were severely caught out by this: several extreme clippers had been launched in 1869, including Cutty Sark, Norman Court and the Caliph.

Surviving ships 
Of the many clipper ships built during the mid-19th century, only two are known to survive. The only intact survivor is Cutty Sark, which was preserved as a museum ship in 1954 at Greenwich for public display. The other known survivor is City of Adelaide; unlike Cutty Sark she was reduced to a hulk over the years. She eventually sank at her moorings in 1991, but was raised the following year and remained on dry land for years. Adelaide (a.k.a. S.V. Carrick) is the older of the two survivors, and was transported to Australia for conservation.

In popular culture
The clipper legacy appears in collectible cards and in the name of a basketball team.

Sailing cards 

Departures of clipper ships, mostly from New York and Boston to San Francisco, were advertised by clipper ship sailing cards.  These cards, slightly larger than today's postcards, were produced by letterpress and wood engraving on coated card stock.  Most clipper cards were printed in the 1850s and 1860s, and represented the first pronounced use of color in American advertising art. Perhaps 3,500 cards survive.  With their rarity and importance as artifacts of nautical, Western, and printing history, clipper cards are valued by both private collectors and institutions.

Basketball team 
The Los Angeles Clippers of the National Basketball Association (NBA) take their name from the type of ship. After the Buffalo Braves moved to San Diego, California, a contest was held to choose a new name. The winning name highlighted the city's connection with the clippers that frequented San Diego Bay. The team retained the name in its 1993 move to Los Angeles.

See also 

 List of clipper ships
 Clipper route
 Packet boat 
 Sail-plan
 Windjammer

People associated with clipper ships
 List of people who sailed on clipper ships
 Joseph Warren Holmes
 Samuel Hartt Pook
 William Jardine
 Donald McKay
 John (or "Jock") "White Hat" Willis

Notes

Footnotes

References
Carl C. Cutler, Greyhounds of the Sea (1930, 3rd ed. Naval Institute Press 1984)
 Alexander Laing, Clipper Ship Men (1944)
 David R. MacGregor, Fast Sailing Ships: Their Design and Construction, 1775–1875  Naval Institute Press, 1988   
 Oxford English Dictionary (1987) .
 Bruce D. Roberts, Clipper Ship Sailing Cards, 2007, Lulu.com.  .
 Bruce D. Roberts, Clipper Ship Cards:  The High-Water Mark in Early Trade Cards, The Advertising Trade Card Quarterly 1, no. 1 (Spring 1994): 20–22.
 Bruce D. Roberts, Clipper Ship Cards:  Graphic Themes and Images, The Advertising Trade Card Quarterly 1, no. 2 (Summer 1994): 22–24.
 Bruce D. Roberts, Museum Collections of Clipper Ship Cards, The Advertising Trade Card Quarterly 2, no. 1 (Spring 1995): 22–24.
 Bruce D. Roberts, Selling Sail with Clipper Ship Cards, Ephemera News 19, no. 2 (Winter 2001): 1, 11–14.

Further reading

Overview and introduction

 – Beautifully illustrated introduction, by a member of Donald McKay's family
 – Basic reading, a favorite of Franklin Delano Roosevelt
Westward by Sea: A Maritime Perspective on American Expansion, 1820–1890, digitized source materials from Mystic Seaport, via Library of Congress American Memory

American clipper ships
 – The definitive narrative history, useful for checking discrepancies between sources
 – The comprehensive reference for design and construction of American-built clipper ships, with numerous drawings, diagrams, and charts. Gives examples of how each design feature varies in different ships.
 Articles on individual ships, broader coverage than Crothers

Clipper ships by type

 – British and Australian clippers

 – One of the few comprehensive books on these ships

External links

City of Adelaide Clipper Ship, one of the few surviving clippers
Westward by Sea Library of Congress collection of sailing cards.
The Shipslist: Baltimore Clipper
The Clipper Ship Card Collection at the New-York Historical Society

 
Merchant sailing ship types
Sailing rigs and rigging